La Sénia is a municipality in the comarca of Montsià in 
Catalonia, Spain.

This town is located in a plain by the Sénia River at the western end of the Montsià county. The limestone massif of the Ports de Tortosa-Beseit rises a few miles west of the town.

There are important celebrations every year in September in honor of Our Lady of Pallerols.

History
La Sénia was an important resting point for wayfarers and transhumant cattle herders in the past with roadside inns where travelers could rest and recover from the day's journey.

In 1937 a military airfield was built by the Spanish Republican Air Force. Its location was chosen due to its strategic position, equidistant of the then republican cities of Barcelona and Valencia (for defensive purposes) and the then nationalist Zaragoza and Mallorca island (for attack purposes). The airfield was first used by the Spanish Republican Air Force. In 1938 it was captured by the rebels. Franco offered the airfield to Hitler, who sent the Condor Legion, composed of Luftwaffe's airplanes and pilots. They used it during the rest of the Spanish Civil War. The airfield was abandoned shortly after the war was over.

La Sénia experienced an economic boom during the 1990s as the local industries producing furniture profited from the real estate bubble in Spain. The town is now suffering much as a consequence of the late-2000s recession. La Sénia is part of the Taula del Sénia free association of municipalities. The Ulldecona Dam is located close to La Sénia.

La Sénia is recognized with the population charter of April 17, 1232. On September 13, 1233, Pere Montcada made a feudal concession of the town of La Sénia to Mr. Guillem de Moragues (born in Tortosa) for his repopulation. On January 25, 1336, Guillem de Moragues delivered the settlement charter to twenty-one residents and in this way, the town of La Sénia was established within the jurisdiction of the castle of Ulldecona.

Villages
Els Plans, 31
La Sénia, 6,148

Twin towns — Sister cities
 Cazorla, Spain

References

External links 

 Pàgina web de l'Ajuntament
 Government data pages 

Municipalities in Montsià